Ron Crotty (December 31, 1929 – May 7, 2015), born Ronald O'Crotty, was an American jazz bassist. He became known in the late 1940s and early 1950s for work with pianists Dave Brubeck and Vince Guaraldi.

Career
Crotty played the violin and sang as a child in the church choir. When the school orchestra needed a bass player, he started to master this instrument. He was gripped by the bebop and went to San Francisco State University to teach. He played in a bebop band with, among others, Al Molina and met Cal Tjader, who later recommended him to Dave Brubeck when the pianist wanted to start a trio. His work at Brubeck was interrupted by his military service.

After two years, Crotty returned to Brubeck, now in his quartet with Paul Desmond and Lloyd Daviswhich became famous with the album Jazz at Oberlin (1953). After a year, he left Brubeck due to hepatitis and returned to San Francisco after years of touring, where his music career was ruined by alcohol and amphetamine addiction. During his time in San Francisco, he performed with pianist Vince Guaraldi and guitarist Eddie Duran and appeared as the Ron Crotty Trio on Modern Music from San Francisco (1956).

Crotty also worked odd jobs on the side to supplement his income. He finally beat his addictions in 1997.

Crotty played regularly in the Oakland Museum café for years, with valve trombonist Frank Phipps and guitarist Tony Corman and other Bay Area jazz musicians. He also had his own group, Ron Crotty & Friends, with which he performed in San Francisco and the surrounding area. A trio album with Phipps and Corman was released in 2009.

Death
Crotty died in Berkeley, California, on May 7, 2015.

Discography
 Crotty, Corman and Phipps (2009) (CD on Amazon)

With Dave Brubeck
 Brubeck Trio with Cal Tjader Vol. 1 & 2 (1950)
 Jazz at Oberlin (1953)
 Live in Concert (2002)
 At Welshire Ebell: the Historic 1953 Los Angeles Concert (2006)

With Vince Guaraldi
Modern Music from San Francisco (1956)

External links
 Biography at AllMusic
 "A bassist bounces back"; interview with Crotty in The Monthly

American jazz double-bassists
1929 births
2015 deaths